Yajaw Teʼ Kʼinich was a Maya king of city-state Motul de San José in Guatemala. He ruled c. 725–755.

He was a successor and possibly son of Sak Muwaan.

His artist is named on the ceramics as Tʼuubal Ajaw, Lord of Tʼuubal.

Yajaw Teʼ Kʼinich is depicted on one Ik-style vessel wearing a mask and dancing, he is also depicted on Stelae 2 and 6 in the site core. He is recorded on one vessel as possibly having died in AD 755.

His successor was Lamaw Ekʼ.

References

Kings of Motul de San José
8th century in Guatemala